Eutropis multifasciata, commonly known as the East Indian brown mabuya, many-lined sun skink, many-striped skink, common sun skink or (ambiguously) as golden skink, is a species of skink.

Description
See Snake scales for terminology

Snout moderate, obtuse. Lower eyelid scaly. Nostril behind vertical of the suture between rostral and first labial; a postnasal; anterior loreal not deeper than the second, in contact with the first labial; supranasals frequently in contact behind rostral; frontonasal broader than long; prefrontals constantly forming a median suture; frontal as long as or shorter than the frontoparietals and interparietal together, in contact with the second (rarely also with the first) supraocular:  4 supraoculars, second largest; 6 supraciliaries, first largest; fronto-parietals distinct, larger than the interparietal, which entirely separates the parietals; a pair of nuchals, 4 labials anterior to the subocular, which is large and not narrower below. Ear-opening roundish or oval, as large as a lateral scale, or a little smaller, with or without a few very small lobules anteriorly. Dorsal scales more or less distinctly tri-(rarely quinque-) carinate: nuchals and laterals usually very feebly keeled, sometimes smooth; 30 to 34 scales round the middle of the body, subequal or dorsals largest. The hind limb reaches the wrist or the elbow of the adpressed fore limb. Subdigital lamellae smooth. Scales on upper surface of tibia mostly tricarinate. Tail 1.3 to 1.6 times length of head and body. Brown or olive above ; some specimens uniform, or with a large whitish (red) patch on each side; back frequently with small black spots, sometimes confluent into longitudinal lines; sides frequently dark brown, with whitish, black-edged ocelli; a well-defined light dorso-lateral band seldom present; lower surfaces yellowish or greenish white.

Invasive species

Taiwan
Eutropis multifasciata was first observed in Taiwan in 1992, in the southern Kaohsiung area. It has since spread northward and established populations in the central-western and south-western lowlands.  The species has successfully adapted to Taiwan's agricultural areas, open forests, and human-disturbed areas. It's high fecundity (reproductive ability) has enabled it to compete with other species for resources. This is likely the cause of the decline in the populations of indigenous lizard species that occupy the same habitats as Eutropis multifasciata. Since this species has a poor cold tolerance, its elevational distribution in Taiwan is restricted below 500 meters. However, it is expected that in response to rising temperatures associated with climate change, this species will benefit from increased maximum activity time. As a result, distribution of this species is expected to expand from lowland areas to higher elevations, especially if the landscape becomes more open.

Distribution
 Bangladesh
 Cambodia
 China (Hainan, Yunnan)
 India (Assam)
 Indonesia (Borneo, Sumatra, Java, Bali)
 Laos
 Japan (Ryukyu Islands, mostly Okinawa, Miyako and Yaeyama)
 Malaysia (Peninsular, Pulau Tioman, Johor: Pulau Besar, Pulau Sibu, Langkawi)
 Myanmar (a.k.a. Burma)
 New Guinea
 Philippines (Negros, Panay, Palawan: Calamian Islands, Luzon)
 Singapore
 Taiwan
 Thailand (incl. Phuket) 
 Vietnam
 Pakistan

References

External links
 

Eutropis
Reptiles of India
Reptiles of Thailand
Reptiles of Indonesia
Reptiles described in 1820
Taxa named by Heinrich Kuhl